Tirado is a surname and a given name of Castilian origin. The Tirado family has its roots in the mountains of León, where the earliest manor or casa solar is found. During the Reconquista, branches of Tirado spread to New Castile (La Mancha), Extremadura (Cáceres), Valencia (Castellón) and Andalusia (Huelva), wherefrom it passed to the Americas. Notable people with the name include:

Surname:

Alfonso Ortiz Tirado (1893–1960), opera singer and doctor of medicine from Álamos (Sonora), Mexico
Álvaro Tirado Mejía (born 1940), historian, diplomat and professor, former president of the Inter-American Commission on Human Rights
Ángel Buendía Tirado (born 1951), Mexican economist and politician affiliated with the Institutional Revolutionary Party
Cándido Tirado, Puerto Rican playwright who moved to the Bronx from Puerto Rico at age 11
Carlos Iván Tirado Magaña (born 2005), professional baseball player for the Pittsburgh Pirates from El Habal (Mazatlán), Mexico
Carlos José Tirado Tirado (born 1958), lawyer and nurse, president of the council of nursing colleges of Castile and La Mancha, Spain
Carlos J. Tirado Yepes (born 1964), Venezuelan artist, painter and sculptor in southern Florida, United States
Fabio Betancur Tirado (1938–2011), archbishop of the Roman Catholic Archdiocese of Manizales (Caldas), Colombia
Fernando Tirado y Cardona (1862–1907), royal portrait painter and professor of fine arts from Sevilla (Andalusia), Spain
Filipo Tirado (born 1949), Puerto Rican puppeteer
Francisco Sutil Tirado (born 1984), Spanish professional footballer
Jacob Tirado (1540–1620), merchant and shipowner, one of the founders of the Spanish-Portuguese community of Amsterdam, Holland
Jeannie Tirado, American voice actress
Josep Pasqual Tirado (1884–1937), author of mythological adventure stories from Castellón de la Plana (Valencia), Spain
Juan Tirado y Cabello de Aguilar (1674–1749), military officer of the Spanish empire, colonial mayor of Medellín (Antioquia), Colombia
Juan Carlos Tirado Carroza (born 1968), classical theater actor and director from Mérida (Extremadura), Spain
Juan Carlos Tirado Zavala (1955–2020), journalist and diplomat, ambassador of Mexico to Iran, Guatemala and the Dominican Republic
Juan Cortada Tirado (1864–1937), Puerto Rican politician, businessman, and landowner
Linda Tirado, author of Hand to Mouth: Living in Bootstrap America
Luis Tirado (1906–1964), Chilean former footballer and manager
Nelida Tirado, American flamenco dancer based in New York City
Romualdo Tirado (1880–1963), stage actor and theater impresario with a prolific career in Spanish language films produced in Hollywood
Teodoro Jose Tirado García (born 1985), known as Teo, Spanish professional footballer
Tony Tirado, Peruvian sports commentator and former football goalkeeper in the North American Soccer League

Given name:

Cirilo Tirado Delgado, Puerto Rican politician and attorney
Cirilo Tirado Rivera (born 1964), Puerto Rican politician and Senator
Domingo Tirado Benedí (1898–1971), Spanish-born educator
Reyna Tirado Gálvez (born 1982), Mexican politician from the Institutional Revolutionary Party

See also
Tirad
Tiradito
Tirando
Trado